Howard Lapham (May 11, 1914 – April 16, 2008)  was a modernist architect whose notable residences exist primarily in Southern California.

Career
He relocated to the Coachella Valley in the California desert east of Los Angeles in 1954 from Stamford, CT at age 40. Soon after settling into this desert community, he began designing homes for California's wealthy and movie elite. Many of Lapham's clients were members of the Thunderbird Country Club. Development near the golf club's fairways and up the slopes of the foothills grew into "Thunderbird Heights." These Lapham buildings appeared in Architectural Digest: 
Hyatt von Dehn Residence (1960, Thunderbird Heights), the Kiewit Residence (1960, Thunderbird Country Club), the Clarke Swanson Residence (1961, Thunderbird Country Club), the Morrow Residence (1961, Silver Spur Ranch, Palm Desert),  a remodel of the Thunderbird Country Club clubhouse (1961), and Ichpa Mayapan (2015, Thunderbird Heights, Rancho Mirage).  

Lapham's early work included custom homes in Palm Spring's Deepwell Estates including Manzanita House, known for its asymmetrical lot position and glass-with-stone facade, located just east of downtown. Perhaps Lapham's most famous renovation was that of the famous Chi Chi nightclub in 1959, the facade of which was redone in "ultra-modern" style.  In 1970, Lapham built the Mayan-themed Cook House, known as Ichpa Mayapan, atop Thunderbird Heights.  The Cook house is one of several homes chronicled in the independent film Desert Utopia, Mid-Century Architecture in Palm Springs. Lapham's signature placement of houses against carefully chosen flat-niches is characteristic of his desert homes.

Between 1959 and 1963 some of Lapham's Palm Springs buildings were designed with help from Haralamb H. Georgescu, a Romanian-born architect.

References
 City of Rancho Mirage Historic Preservation architect bios

20th-century American architects
1914 births 
2008 deaths